Andrew Robison Govan (January 13, 1794 – June 27, 1841) was a U.S. Representative from South Carolina.

Born in Orange Parish, Orangeburg District, South Carolina, Govan pursued classical studies at a private school in Willington, South Carolina, and was graduated from South Carolina College at Columbia in 1813.
He served as member of the State house of representatives 1820–1821.

Govan was elected as a Democratic-Republican to the Seventeenth Congress to fill the vacancy caused by the death of James Overstreet.

Govan was elected as a Jackson Republican to the Eighteenth Congress, and reelected as a Jacksonian to the Nineteenth Congress, and served from December 4, 1822, to March 3, 1827.
He moved to Mississippi in 1828 and devoted the remainder of his life to planting.
He died in Marshall County, Mississippi, June 27, 1841.
He was interred in the family cemetery on the estate, "Snowdown" plantation in Marshall County.

He was the father of George M. Govan (1840-1899), who was the 27th Secretary of State of Mississippi, serving from 1886 to 1896.

Sources

1794 births
1841 deaths
Democratic-Republican Party members of the United States House of Representatives from South Carolina
Jacksonian members of the United States House of Representatives from South Carolina
19th-century American politicians
People from Orangeburg County, South Carolina